Count It All Joy is the ninth album from American gospel music artist Susie Luchsinger. It was released on May 3, 2005 on New Haven Records.

Track listing
"Count It All Joy" (Kenna Turner West) - 3:52
"Always, Always" (Bill Aerts, Scott Lynch) - 4:29
"There's Still Hope" (Adam Wheeler) - 4:10
"Slow Dance More" (Doug Johnson, Pat Bunch) - 3:10
"What We've Been Praying For" (Brent Wilson) - 3:52 
"The Bride" (Adam Wheeler, Tony Haselden) - 4:32
"Then They Do" (Jim Collins, Sunny Russ) - 4:09
"Someday I Know" (Mike Bowling) - 2:35
"Sittin' At A Red Light" (Ray Stephenson, Steve Williams, Willis R. Nance) - 4:00
"Parable of the Windmill" (John Gaither) - 3:33
"Untitled Hymn (Come to Jesus)" (Chris Rice) - 4:00

Personnel
Kelly Back - electric guitar
Lori Brooks - background vocals
Margie Cates - background vocals
Richard Dennison - background vocals
Stuart Duncan - fiddle, mandolin
James Easter - background vocals
Sonny Garrish - dobro, steel guitar
Ranger Doug Green - archguitar
David Hungate - bass guitar
Shane Keister - piano
Paul Leim - drums, percussion
Ronnie Light - background vocals
Susie Luchsinger - lead vocals
Brent Mason - electric guitar
Gordon Mote - piano
Gary Prim - piano
Bryan Sutton - acoustic guitar
Jeff Taylor - accordion
Darrin Vincent - background vocals
Pete Wade - gut string guitar
Kris Wilkinson - string contractor
Andrea Zonn - background vocals

Awards

The album was nominated for a Dove Award for Country Album of the Year at the 37th GMA Dove Awards.

References

2005 albums
Susie McEntire albums